Protocadherin-12 is a protein that in humans is encoded by the PCDH12 gene.

This gene belongs to the protocadherin gene family, a subfamily of the cadherin superfamily. The encoded protein consists of an extracellular domain containing 6 cadherin repeats, a transmembrane domain and a cytoplasmic tail that differs from those of the classical cadherins. The gene localizes to the region on chromosome 5 where the protocadherin gene clusters reside. The exon organization of this transcript is similar to that of the gene cluster transcripts, notably the first large exon, but no significant sequence homology exists. The function of this cellular adhesion protein is undetermined but mouse protocadherin 12 does not bind catenins and appears to have no effect on cell migration or growth.

References

Further reading